The Grand Master of the Order of St John of Jerusalem had to pay an annual tribute to the Emperor Charles V and his mother Queen Joanna of Castile  as monarchs of Sicily, for the granting of Tripoli, Malta and Gozo. There were also other conditions. The annual tribute payable on All Saints day (1 November) was one falcon. The grant was made at Castelfranco Emilia and is dated "the 23rd day of the month of March, Third Indiction, in the Year of Our Lord 1530; in the 10th year of our reign as Emperor, the 27th as King of Castile, Granada etc., the 16th of Navarre, the 15th of Aragon, the Two Sicilies, Jerusalem and all our other realms".

Text of the grant
The grant says:

Conditions
The investiture had to be renewed in every case of a new succession, and completed according to the dispositions of common law. Other conditions included:
 Non-aggression against Sicily;
 No immunity to fugitives of justice;
 Nomination of bishop of Malta;
 Appointment of bishop as Grand Cross and membership of the Order's Council;
 Preference to appoint an Italian as Admiral of the Order;
 Prohibition of transferability of the fief; 
 Arbitration in case of dispute;
 Under whatsoever laws or conditions they may have in favour of the people already residing there;

The order and grand master paid the annual falcon until 1798 when the Order was expelled from the Maltese islands by the French Directory.

In popular culture

The Knights of Malta's tribute of a falcon is referenced in the 1930 Dashiell Hammett novel The Maltese Falcon, as well as in the 1941 film adaptation.

References

External links
 Full text of grant

1530 in Malta
History of the Sovereign Military Order of Malta
1530 in the Kingdom of Sicily